The New Zealand national cricket team toured Bangladesh from 4 October to 6 November 2013. The tour consisted of two Test matches, three One Day Internationals and one Twenty20 International match.

Warm-up Match

Test series

1st Test

2nd Test

ODI series

1st ODI

2nd ODI

3rd ODI

Twenty20 International series

Only T20I

See also
 2013–14 Bangladeshi cricket season

References

2013 in Bangladeshi cricket
2013 in New Zealand cricket
International cricket competitions in 2013–14
New Zealand cricket tours of Bangladesh
Bangladeshi cricket seasons from 2000–01